The 2009  Seattle Seahawks season was the franchise's 34th season in the National Football League (NFL), the 8th playing their home games at Qwest Field and the first and only season under head coach Jim Mora. The Seahawks slightly improved from their 4–12 record and a third-place finish in what was Mike Holmgren's final season coaching the team in 2008 and finished with a 5–11 record. However, Mora was fired January 8, 2010.

Offseason

Staff changes

At the beginning of the 2008 season, head coach Mike Holmgren had stated that 2008 was his final season before retiring. On December 30, 2008, two days after the season ended, Holmgren officially retired and stepped down as head coach. Jim Mora, the team's assistant head coach and defensive backs coach, was officially selected as his replacement on January 13, 2009. The retirement and Jim Mora's accession had been originally announced on January 22, 2008.

Mora then began to replace most of the staff that Holmgren had last year. Defensive coordinator John Marshall and defensive line coach Dwaine Board were both fired on January 12, 2009. Subsequently, former Tampa Bay Buccaneers linebackers coach Casey Bradley was hired as the new defensive coordinator. Also, former New York Jets assistant Dan Quinn replaced Board as the defensive line coach and as the new assistant head coach.

The offensive side was also revamped as well. Offensive coordinator Gil Haskell was dismissed after 8 years with the Seahawks. Former Oakland Raiders offensive coordinator Greg Knapp, who had previously worked with Mora when he was the head coach of the Atlanta Falcons, was hired as his replacement on January 14, 2009. Mora also fired wide receivers coach Keith Gilbertson and was replaced with former Jacksonville Jaguars assistant receivers coach Robert Prince. Finally, tight ends coach Jim Lind and special teams assistant John Jamison both retired after the 2008 season. Mike DeBord, formerly the offensive line assistant coach, replaced Lind although no replacement has been named for Jamison.

Key departures

Running back Maurice Morris, who backed up starter Julius Jones last season, signed with the Detroit Lions. The Seahawks also lost defensive tackle Rocky Bernard to the New York Giants. Fan favorite Bobby Engram was released and signed with the Kansas City Chiefs after the Seahawks signed wide receiver T. J. Houshmandzadeh.  The Seahawks were also in talks with fullback Leonard Weaver about a new contract, but ultimately he signed with the Philadelphia Eagles instead. Also, the Seahawks traded away Pro Bowl linebacker Julian Peterson to the Lions.  In all, the Seahawks lost a total of 14 players to free agency.

Linebacker Leroy Hill was placed under the franchise tag on February 19, 2009. However, discussions for a long-term deal between Hill and the Seahawks were slow, and they continued to stall up to the draft. In an effort to speed up negotiations, the Seahawks removed their franchise tag on Hill less than 24 hours within the first draft day, thereby releasing him to free agency and allowing him to sign with other teams. However, on April 30, 2009, Hill agreed to a six-year, 38 million-dollar deal with the Seahawks.

Moments after signing Edgerrin James to a one-year deal, the Seahawks released running back T. J. Duckett to make room on their roster. Duckett had led the team in rushing touchdowns the previous year.

Safety Brian Russell was also released on September 5, 2009. Russell had started at safety for the Seahawks since coming in at the start of the 2007 season. Strong safety Lawyer Milloy was signed after Russell's departure to fill his spot (along with Jordan Babineaux).

Key additions

The Seahawks made big splashes during the offseason as well. On March 1, Seattle signed defensive tackle Colin Cole from the Green Bay Packers to a 5-year contract to address problems on their defensive line. They also received defensive tackle Cory Redding and a fifth round pick in exchange for the Peterson trade mentioned above.

Perhaps the biggest move in free agency, however, was the signing of former Pro Bowl wide receiver T. J. Houshmandzadeh from the Cincinnati Bengals to a 5-year, $40 million deal with $15 million guaranteed two days after signing Cole. Houshmandzadeh was rated as one of the top free agents available.

After rescinding their franchise tag on Hill, the Seahawks signed former Carolina Panthers corner back Ken Lucas to a one-year deal in order to bolster their pass coverage. They also signed fullback Justin Griffith from the Oakland Raiders to address the departure of Weaver. It was known that releasing of Hill created some flexibility on the salary cap of where these two deals go into play.

On August 25, 2009, the Seahawks signed running back Edgerrin James to a 1-year, $2 million deal. James last played with division rival Arizona Cardinals for the previous three seasons and played a vital role in their playoff run last year. The Seahawks also signed veteran safety Lawyer Milloy to a one-year deal, who is expected to make a big impact to the team.

2009 NFL Draft

Seattle traded their 5th round draft pick to the Denver Broncos for wide receiver Keary Colbert, but received another 5th round draft pick from Detroit.

On draft day, the Seahawks traded away their 2nd round pick (37th overall) to the Denver Broncos for their 2010 1st round pick. They also traded for Chicago's 2nd round pick (49th overall) in return for both their 3rd and 4th round picks in the draft (68th and 105th respectively). Finally, the Seahawks traded for Philadelphia's 3rd round pick (91st overall) for their 2010 3rd round pick and their 5th and 7th round picks in the draft (137th and 213rd respectively).

Coaching staff and roster

Coaching staff

Final roster

     Starters in bold.

Team captains
 Matt Hasselbeck
 Walter Jones
 Lofa Tatupu
 Deon Grant
 Lance Laury
 Olindo Mare

Schedule

Preseason

Regular season
Divisional matchups have the NFC West playing the NFC North and the AFC South.

Bold indicates division opponents.

Standings

Game Summaries

Preseason

Week P1: at San Diego Chargers

Week P2: vs. Denver Broncos

Week P3: at Kansas City Chiefs

Week P4: vs. Oakland Raiders

Regular season

Week 1: vs. St. Louis Rams

Head Coach Jim Mora era began his coaching debut for the Seahawks with a game at home against division rival St. Louis Rams. Quarterback Matt Hasselbeck and the offense struggled early, turning over the ball three times (two interceptions and one fumble) on the first quarter alone. After Rams kicker Olindo Mare missed a 37-yard field goal for the lead, Hasselbeck led the Seahawks to their first score of the game after he connected with tight end John Carlson for a touchdown. With the second quarter coming to a close, St. Louis returned a blocked field goal for a touchdown, only to have it overruled by a penalty. This gave another chance for the Seahawks to score, as Hasselbeck threw his second touchdown of the game to Nate Burleson to put the Seahawks up 14–0 by halftime.

When the third quarter started, the Seahawks looked to increase its lead to win the game. Hasselbeck led the Seahawks to a 99-yard drive, capping it off 33-yard touchdown pass to Carlson. Julius Jones sealed the win with a 62-yard touchdown (and rushing 119 in total) run to put Seattle up by 28. The Seahawks defense shut out the Rams, as they totaled only 247 total yards on offense and forcing two fumbles and three sacks. Seattle moved to 1–0 to start off the season, and beat the Rams for the ninth straight time.

Week 2: at San Francisco 49ers

Coming off their shutout home win over the Rams, the Seahawks flew to Candlestick Park for a Week 2 NFC West showdown with the San Francisco 49ers.

Seattle trailed early in the first quarter as 49ers kicker Joe Nedney got a 37-yard field goal, along with running back Frank Gore getting a 79-yard touchdown run. The Seahawks responded in the second quarter as kicker Olindo Mare made a 36-yard field goal. San Francisco replied with Nedney making a 42-yard field goal. As the Seahawks looked to bounced back from the deficit, quarterback Matt Hasselbeck received an injury as he was hit on the ground by 49ers linebacker Patrick Willis. Hasselbeck left the game with cracked ribs, but Seattle closed out the half with backup Seneca Wallace completing a 1-yard touchdown pass to running back Julius Jones.

In the third quarter, the Seahawks deficit quickly increased as on the 49ers' first offensive play of the second half, Gore exploded for an 80-yard touchdown run. San Francisco closed the game in the fourth quarter as Nedney nailed a 39-yard field goal.

With the loss, Seattle fell to 1–1.

Week 3: vs. Chicago Bears

Hoping to rebound from their divisional road loss to the 49ers, the Seahawks went home, donned their alternate uniforms, and prepared for a Week 3 duel with the Chicago Bears. Due to quarterback Matt Hasselbeck's rib injury, Seneca Wallace got the start for the game.

Seattle took an early lead in the first quarter with Wallace's 39-yard touchdown pass to running back Julius Jones and kicker Olindo Mare's 46-yard field goal. The Seahawks tacked on Mare's 37-yard field goal in the second quarter, but the Bears answered with quarterback Jay Cutler's 1-yard touchdown pass to tight end Greg Olsen.

Chicago took in the lead in the third quarter with Cutler's 7-yard touchdown pass to wide receiver Johnny Knox, followed by kicker Robbie Gould's 37-yard field goal. The Seahawks regained the lead in the fourth quarter with Mare's 39-yard and 46-yard field goal. However, the Bears got the last laugh as Cutler hooked up with wide receiver Devin Hester on a 36-yard touchdown pass (with a successful 2-point conversion pass to wide receiver Earl Bennett). Seattle tried to rally, but Chicago's defense held on for the win.

With the loss, the Seahawks fell to 1–2.

Week 4: at Indianapolis Colts

Trying to snap a two-game losing streak, the Seahawks flew to Lucas Oil Stadium for a Week 4 inter-conference duel with the Indianapolis Colts. Seattle trailed as Colts running back Donald Brown got a 1-yard touchdown run in the first quarter, followed by quarterback Peyton Manning's 5-yard touchdown pass to wide receiver Reggie Wayne. The Seahawks got on the board with a 38-yard field goal from kicker Olindo Mare, but Indianapolis closed out the half with Manning's 21-yard touchdown pass to wide receiver Austin Collie.

Following running back Joseph Addai's 12-yard touchdown run in the third quarter, the Colts sealed the win with kicker Adam Vinatieri's 37-yard and 19-yard field goals. Seattle ended the scoring with quarterback Matt Hasselbeck getting a 1-yard touchdown run and completing a 1-yard touchdown pass to fullback Owen Schmitt.

With the loss, the Seahawks fell to 1–3.

Week 5: vs. Jacksonville Jaguars

After missing two weeks with cracked ribs, quarterback Matt Hasselbeck played for the first time since week two at San Francisco. Trying to snap a three-game losing streak, Hasselbeck started the offense off quickly, with Olindo Mare completing two field goals to put Seattle up by 6. The Seahawks defense also held its own, including a 4th-and-2 stop when the Jaguars threaten to score in the red zone. Later in the 2nd quarter, Hasselbeck found wide receiver T. J. Houshmandzadeh for his first touchdown of the year, putting Seattle up 13–0. On their next offensive drive, Hasselbeck connected with Nate Burleson for another touchdown, extending their lead to 20–0, which they took into halftime.

Starting the third quarter on offense, David Garrard and the Jaguars tried to put some points on the board. However, all of their hopes were dashed when defensive end Cory Redding recovered a key fumble for 26 yards. Taking advantage of this, Hasselbeck again found Houshmandzadeh for his second touchdown to seal the game at 27–0. The Seahawks later scored again as Hasselbeck threw his fourth touchdown again to Burleson, while defensive end Nick Reed scored from 79 yards out from a fumble recovery, putting the Seahawks up 41–0.

With the win, the Seahawks improved to 2–3 for the season.

Week 6: vs. Arizona Cardinals

Fresh off their dominating win over the Jaguars, the Seahawks stayed at home for a Week 6 NFC West duel with the Arizona Cardinals. Seattle trailed in the first quarter as Cardinals quarterback Kurt Warner completed a 2-yard touchdown pass to wide receiver Larry Fitzgerald, followed by running back Tim Hightower's 2-yard touchdown run. Arizona increased its lead in the second quarter with a 29-yard field goal from kicker Neil Rackers. The Seahawks then got on the board as kicker Olindo Mare nailed a 28-yard field goal. However, the Cardinals took control in the second half as Warner found wide receiver Steve Breaston on a 16-yard touchdown pass in the third quarter, followed by Rackers' 31-yard field goal in the fourth.

With the loss, Seattle went into their bye week at 2–4.

Week 8: at Dallas Cowboys

Hoping to rebound from their divisional home loss to the Cardinals, the Seahawks flew to Cowboys Stadium for a Week 8 showdown with the Dallas Cowboys. In the first quarter, Seattle struck first as kicker Olindo Mare got a 43-yard field goal. However, the Cowboys answered with quarterback Tony Romo's 36-yard touchdown pass to wide receiver Sam Hurd. Dallas increased their lead in the second quarter with a 2-yard touchdown run from running back Marion Barber. The Seahawks replied with quarterback Matt Hasselbeck completing a 23-yard touchdown pass to wide receiver Deion Branch, but Dallas came right back with Romo finding wide receiver Roy Williams on a 7-yard touchdown pass.

The Cowboys took a huge lead with Romo's 3-yard touchdown pass to wide receiver Miles Austin, followed by wide receiver Patrick Crayton returning a punt 82 yards for a touchdown. In the fourth quarter, Dallas closed out its scoring with a 40-yard field goal from kicker Nick Folk. Seattle tried to rally, but could only muster up Hasselbeck's 4-yard touchdown pass to fullback Justin Griffith.

With the loss, the Seahawks fell to 2–5.

Week 9: vs. Detroit Lions

Trying to snap a two-game losing streak, the Seahawks went home for a Week 9 duel with the Detroit Lions. Seattle trailed in the first quarter as Lions quarterback Matthew Stafford completed a 7-yard touchdown pass to tight end Brandon Pettigrew and a 29-yard touchdown pass to wide receiver Bryant Johnson, followed by kicker Jason Hanson getting a 41-yard field goal. Seattle answered in the second quarter as running back Julius Jones got a 3-yard touchdown run, followed by kicker Olindo Mare nailing a pair of 37-yard field goals.

In the third quarter, the Seahawks took the lead as Mare got a 24-yard field goal, while quarterback Matt Hasselbeck hooked up with wide receiver T. J. Houshmandzadeh on a 2-yard touchdown pass (with a failed two-point conversion). Seattle increased their lead in the fourth quarter as Mare booted a 20-yard field goal. Detroit tried to rally as Hanson made a 50-yard field goal, but the Seahawks ended the scoring with cornerback Josh Wilson returning an interception 61 yards for a touchdown.

With the win, Seattle improved to 3–5.

Week 10: at Arizona Cardinals

Coming off their home win over the Lions, the Seahawks flew to the University of Phoenix Stadium for a Week 10 NFC West rematch with the Arizona Cardinals. Seattle took flight in the first quarter as running back Justin Forsett got an 11-yard touchdown run. The Seahawks added to their lead in the second quarter with quarterback Matt Hasselbeck completing a 31-yard touchdown pass to tight end John Carlson. The Cardinals answered with quarterback Kurt Warner completing a 28-yard touchdown pass to wide receiver Steve Breaston, yet Seattle came right back with a 32-yard field goal from kicker Olindo Mare. Arizona closed out the half with kicker Neil Rackers nailing a 27-yard field goal.

In the third quarter, the Cardinals tied the game with running back Chris "Beanie" Wells getting a 10-yard touchdown run. The Seahawks responded in the fourth quarter as Mare booted a 20-yard field goal, but Arizona got the last laugh as Wells picked up a 13-yard touchdown run and Warner hooked up with wide receiver Larry Fitzgerald on an 18-yard touchdown pass.

With the loss, Seattle fell to 3–6.

Week 11: at Minnesota Vikings

Hoping to rebound from their loss to the Cardinals, the Seahawks flew to the Hubert H. Humphrey Metrodome for an Inter conference duel with the Minnesota Vikings.

Seattle trailed early in the second quarter when QB Brett Favre completed three touchdown passes: One to WR Percy Harvin for 23 yards, TE Visanthe Shiancoe for 8 yards and then to WR Bernard Berrian for 3 yards. Then in the third quarter the margin increased as Favre hooked up with WR Sidney Rice on a 7-yard touchdown pass. Then Seattle's kicker Olindo Mare got a 40-yard field goal to avoid a shutout loss. In the fourth quarter the margin increased even further as QB Tarvaris Jackson made a 34-yard touchdown pass to WR Sidney Rice, then Seattle has their first touchdown of this game when RB Justin Forsett made a 1-yard run (With a failed 2-point conversion attempt).

With the loss, Seattle fell to 3–7.

Week 12: at St. Louis Rams

Week 13: vs. San Francisco 49ers

Week 14: at Houston Texans

Week 15: vs. Tampa Bay Buccaneers

Week 16: at Green Bay Packers

Week 17: vs. Tennessee Titans

Chris Johnson became the sixth player in NFL history to break 2,000 rushing yards and also broke the record (held by Marshall Faulk) of total yards from scrimmage at 2,509. Johnson rushed 36 times for 134 yards and two touchdowns; a 64-yard rushing score was called back on a holding penalty. Matt Hasselbeck was 15–30 for 175 yards, one touchdown, and one pick.

References

External links
2009 Seattle Seahawks season at Pro Football Reference
2009 Seattle Seahawks season at ESPN

Seattle Seahawks
Seattle Seahawks seasons
Seattle Seahawks